Víctor Aldana Maestre (born 9 June 1981, Badajoz, Spain) is a Spanish former footballer with Romanian citizenship.

References

External links
Profile at cfrtimisoara.ro 

1981 births
Living people
Spanish footballers
Liga II players
FC CFR Timișoara players
Association football defenders
Expatriate footballers in Romania
Spanish expatriate sportspeople in Romania